James Brudenell may refer to:
James Brudenell, 5th Earl of Cardigan (1715–1811), British politician
James Brudenell, 7th Earl of Cardigan (1797–1868), British politician and soldier
James Brudenell (died 1746), British Member of Parliament for Andover and Chichester

See also
Brudenell Baronets
Brudenell (disambiguation)